Kazumasa Segawa (Segawa Kazumasa, born 24 August 1989) is a Japanese sailor. He competed in the Finn event at the 2020 Summer Olympics.

References

External links
 

1989 births
Living people
Japanese male sailors (sport)
Olympic sailors of Japan
Sailors at the 2020 Summer Olympics – Finn
Sailors at the 2018 Asian Games
Place of birth missing (living people)